Robert Goldthwaite Carter (October 29, 1845 – January 4, 1936) was a US Cavalry officer who participated in the American Civil War and the Indian Wars, most notably against the Comanche during which he received the Medal of Honor for his role against a Comanche raiding party at Brazos River in Texas on October 10, 1871.

He became a successful author in his later years writing several books based on his military career, including On the Border with Mackenzie (1935), as well as a series of booklets detailing his years as an Indian fighter on the Texas frontier. Only 100 of these were published for private distribution and are considered extremely rare surviving only in selected excerpts included in On the Border with Mackenzie.

Biography

Born in Bridgton, Maine, Carter moved to Portland with his family in 1847, and again in 1857, to Massachusetts. He was preparing to enter Phillips Academy when Carter enlisted as a private in the 22nd Massachusetts Infantry at the start of the American Civil War and remained with the Army of the Potomac from August 5, 1862, until October 4, 1864. During the war, he took part in the Battle of Antietam, Gettysburg, the Wilderness and the Siege of Petersburg as well as other minor engagements.

In July 1865, he began attending West Point and was eventually commissioned a second lieutenant and assigned to the 4th U.S. Cavalry on June 15, 1870. During the next several years, Carter would participate in a number of expeditions against the Comanche and other tribes in the Texas-area.

It was during one of these campaigns that he was brevetted first lieutenant and awarded the Medal of Honor for his "most distinguished gallantry" against the Comanche in Blanco Canyon on a tributary of the Brazos River on October 10, 1871. Carter would suffer a severe injury during the battle, his left leg being shattered as his horse fell against a rock, which would eventually result in his early retirement. He would officially receive the medal on January 23, 1900.

Returning to active duty, he joined Colonel Ranald Mackenzie in several campaigns including against the Kickapoo of northern Mexico in May 1873 and awarded a brevet to captain. He did win promotion to first lieutenant on February 21, 1875, although his leg injury disqualified him from active field duty and forced him to retire on June 28, 1876.

Although he eventually recovered from his leg injury after proper treatment, his requests to return to active service were denied by the US Army; instead he was promoted to captain on the retired list in 1904. He taught school and later headed the Washington-bureau of the Public Service Publishing Company in New York City. He would also write a number of booklets and books including Four Brothers in Blue (1913) and The Old Sergeant's Story (1926). However, the most successful was his memoir On the Border With Mackenzie (1935) which was published as the age of 90. He died at Washington, D.C. on January 4, 1936, and buried in Arlington National Cemetery.

Captain Carter was a Companion of the Military Order of the Loyal Legion of the United States.

Medal of Honor citation
Rank and organization: Second Lieutenant, 4th U.S. Cavalry. Place and date: On Brazos, River, Tex., October 10, 1871. Entered service at: Bradford, Mass. Birth: Bridgeport, Maine. Date of issue: February 27, 1900.

Citation:
 Held the left of the line with a few men during the charge of a large body of Indians, after the right of the line had retreated, and by delivering a rapid fire succeeded in checking the enemy until other troops came to the rescue.

Bibliography

Books
The Boy Soldier at Gettysburg (1877)
Four Brothers in Blue (1913)
The Old Sergeant's Story (1926)
On the Border With Mackenzie (1935)

Pamphlets
Record of the Military Service of First Lieutenant and Brevet Captain Robert Goldthwaite Carter, U.S. Army. (1904)
Tragedies of Canon Blanco: A Story of the Texas Panhandle (1919)
The Mackenzie Raid into Mexico (1919)
Massacre of Salt Creek Prairie and the Cowboys' Verdict. (1919)
On the Trail of Deserters: a Phenomenal Capture by Captain Robert Goldthwaite Carter. (1920)
Pursuit of Kicking Bird: a Campaign in Texas 'Bad Lands'''. (1920)

See also

List of Medal of Honor recipients
List of Medal of Honor recipients for the Indian Wars

References

Greene, Jerome A. Battles and Skirmishes of the Great Sioux War, 1876–1877: The Military View. Norman: University of Oklahoma Press, 1993. 
Thrapp, Dan L. Encyclopedia of Frontier Biography: In Three Volumes, Volume I (A–F). Lincoln: University of Nebraska Press, 1988. 

Further reading
Dykes, J.C., ed. On the Border with Mackenzie. New York: Antiquarian Press, 1961.Frontier Times'', Vol II. No. 4. (January 1934). 179–182.

External links
 
 
 
 
 

1845 births
1936 deaths
United States Army Medal of Honor recipients
People of the Great Sioux War of 1876
People from Bridgton, Maine
Union Army soldiers
Union Army officers
United States Army officers
American people of the Indian Wars
Burials at Arlington National Cemetery
American Indian Wars recipients of the Medal of Honor